Indigenous peoples are the earliest known inhabitants of an area, especially one that has been colonized by a now-dominant group. However, usage of the term and who may qualify as being Indigenous vary depending on nationality and culture. In its modern context, the term Indigenous was first used by Europeans, who used it to differentiate the Indigenous peoples of the Americas from the European settlers of the Americas, as well as from the sub-Saharan Africans the settlers enslaved and brought to the Americas by force. The term may have first been used in this context by Sir Thomas Browne in 1646, who stated "and although in many parts thereof there be at present swarms of Negroes serving under the Spaniard, yet were they all transported from Africa, since the discovery of Columbus; and are not indigenous or proper natives of America."

Peoples are usually described as "Indigenous" when they maintain traditions or other aspects of an early culture that is associated with the first inhabitants of a given region. Not all Indigenous peoples share this characteristic, as many have adopted substantial elements of a colonizing culture, such as dress, religion or language. Indigenous peoples may be settled in a given region (sedentary), exhibit a nomadic lifestyle across a large territory, or be resettled, but they are generally historically associated with a specific territory on which they depend. Indigenous societies are found in every inhabited climate zone and continent of the world except Antarctica. There are approximately five thousand Indigenous nations throughout the world.

Indigenous peoples' homelands have historically been colonized by larger ethnic groups, who justified colonization with beliefs of racial and religious superiority, land use or economic opportunity. Thousands of Indigenous nations throughout the world currently live in countries where they are not a majority ethnic group. Indigenous peoples continue to face threats to their sovereignty, economic well-being, languages, ways of knowing, and access to the resources on which their cultures depend. Indigenous rights have been set forth in international law by the United Nations, the International Labour Organization, and the World Bank. In 2007, the UN issued a Declaration on the Rights of Indigenous Peoples (UNDRIP) to guide member-state national policies to the collective rights of Indigenous peoples, including their rights to protect their cultures, identities, languages, ceremonies, and access to employment, health, education and natural resources.

Estimates of the total global population of Indigenous peoples usually range from 250 million to 600 million. Official designations and terminology of who is considered Indigenous vary between countries, ethnic groups and other factors. In the Americas, Australia and New Zealand, Indigenous status is often applied unproblematically to groups descended from the peoples who lived there prior to European settlement. However, In Asia and Africa, definitions of Indigenous status have been either rejected by certain peoples, or applied to minorities and or oppressed peoples, who may not be considered "Indigenous" in other contexts. Thus, population figures are less clear and may fluctuate dramatically.

Etymology 
Indigenous is derived from the Latin word , meaning "sprung from the land, native". The Latin indigena is based on the Old Latin indu "in, within" + gignere "to beget, produce". Indu is an extended form of the Proto-Indo-European en or "in". The origins of the term Indigenous, used to describe people, are not related in any way to the origins of the term Indian, which has also been applied to Indigenous peoples of the Americas.

Autochthonous originates from the Greek αὐτός autós meaning self/own, and χθών chthon meaning Earth. The term is based in the Indo-European root dhghem- (earth). The earliest documented use of this term was in 1804.

Definitions 

As a reference to a group of people, the term Indigenous first came into use by Europeans who used it to differentiate the Indigenous peoples of the Americas from African people who were enslaved. It may have first been used in this context by Sir Thomas Browne. In Chapter 10 of Pseudodoxia Epidemica (1646), entitled "Of the Blackness of Negroes", Browne wrote "and although in many parts thereof there be at present swarms of Negroes serving under the Spaniard, yet were they all transported from Africa, since the discovery of Columbus; and are not indigenous or proper natives of America."

In the 1970s, the term was used as a way of linking the experiences, issues, and struggles of groups of colonized people across international borders. At this time 'indigenous people(s)' also began to be used to describe a legal category in Indigenous law created in international and national legislation. The use of the 's' in 'peoples' recognizes that there are real differences between different Indigenous peoples. James Anaya, former Special Rapporteur on the Rights of Indigenous Peoples, defined Indigenous peoples as "living descendants of pre-invasion inhabitants of lands now dominated by others. They are culturally distinct groups that find themselves engulfed by other settler societies born of forces of empire and conquest".

National definitions
Throughout history, different nations have used a variety of terms to describe the groups within their boundaries that they recognize as Indigenous. Definitions are usually based on a peoples' descent from populations that have historically inhabited the country prior to the time when peoples from non-Indigenous cultures and religions arrivedor at the establishment of present state boundarieswho retain some or all of their own social, economic, cultural and political institutions, but who may have been displaced from their traditional domains or who may have resettled outside their ancestral domains.

The status of the Indigenous groups in the subjugated relationship can be characterized in most instances as an effectively marginalized or isolated group, in comparison to majority groups or the nation-state as a whole. The Indigenous group's ability to influence and participate in the external policies that may exercise jurisdiction over their traditional lands and practices is very frequently limited. This situation can persist even in the case where the Indigenous population outnumbers that of the other inhabitants of the region or state; the defining notion here is one of separation from decision and regulatory processes that have some, at least titular, influence over aspects of their community and land rights.

The presence of external laws, claims and cultural mores either potentially or actually act to variously constrain the practices and observances of an Indigenous society. These constraints can be observed even when the Indigenous society is regulated largely by its own tradition and custom. The constraints may be purposefully imposed, or arise as unintended consequence of trans-cultural interaction. They may have a measurable effect, even where countered by other external influences and actions deemed beneficial or that promote Indigenous rights and interests.

United Nations

The first meeting of the United Nations Working Group on Indigenous Populations (WGIP) was on 9 August 1982 and this date is now celebrated as the International Day of the World's Indigenous Peoples. In 1982 the group accepted a preliminary definition by José R. Martínez-Cobo, Special Rapporteur on Discrimination against Indigenous Populations:

Indigenous communities, peoples, and nations are those that, having a historical continuity with pre-invasion and pre-colonial societies that developed on their territories, consider themselves distinct from other sectors of the societies now prevailing in those territories, or parts of them. They form at present non-dominant sectors of society and are determined to preserve, develop, and transmit to future generations their ancestral territories, and their ethnic identity, as the basis of their continued existence as peoples, in accordance with their own cultural patterns, social institutions and legal systems.

The primary impetus in considering Indigenous identity comes from considering the historical impacts of European colonialism. A 2009 United Nations report published by the Secretariat of the Permanent Forum on Indigenous Issues stated: For centuries, since the time of their colonization, conquest or occupation, Indigenous peoples have documented histories of resistance, interface or cooperation with states, thus demonstrating their conviction and determination to survive with their distinct sovereign identities. Indeed, Indigenous peoples were often recognized as sovereign peoples by states, as witnessed by the hundreds of treaties concluded between Indigenous peoples and the governments of the United States, Canada, New Zealand and others. And yet as Indigenous populations dwindled, and the settler populations grew ever more dominant, states became less and less inclined to recognize the sovereignty of Indigenous peoples. Indigenous peoples themselves, at the same time, continued to adapt to changing circumstances while maintaining their distinct identity as sovereign peoples.The World Health Organization defines Indigenous populations as follows: "communities that live within, or are attached to, geographically distinct traditional habitats or ancestral territories, and who identify themselves as being part of a distinct cultural group, descended from groups present in the area before modern states were created and current borders defined. They generally maintain cultural and social identities, and social, economic, cultural and political institutions, separate from the mainstream or dominant society or culture."

"Blue-water" hypothesis 

The largely Eurocentric so-called "blue-water" hypothesis suggests that only transoceanic (European) colonizers can become the "other" to peoples definedby contrastas "indigenous". Bruce Robbins writes:

Those who would like to define indigenous peoples as exclusively victims of European colonialism have put forward the so-called 'blue-water' hypothesis, according to which colonialism is only colonialism if it involved the crossing of water in a ship, not if it was the result of conquest by land. [...] this hypothesis has been strongly urged by China, which posits that it contains no indigenous peoples. But other Asian nations, like the Philippines, Japan, and Indonesia, have rejected this idea, and even China has muted its references. [...] the effort to save the unique guilt of Europe would plunge us into complete absurdity, absolving European Russia while it also sacrifices the indigenous status of the peoples of the Caucasus and Siberia along with the indigeneity of all other Asians.

History

Classical antiquity
Greek sources of the Classical period acknowledge Indigenous people whom they referred to as "Pelasgians". Ancient writers saw these people either as the ancestors of the Greeks, or as an earlier group of people who inhabited Greece before the Greeks. The disposition and precise identity of this former group is elusive, and sources such as Homer, Hesiod and Herodotus give varying, partially mythological accounts. Dionysius of Halicarnassus in his book, Roman Antiquities, gives a synoptic interpretation of the Pelasgians based on the sources available to him then, concluding that Pelasgians were Greek. Greco-Roman society flourished between 330 BCE and 640 CE and undertook successive campaigns of conquest that subsumed more than half of the known world of the time. But because preexisting populations within other parts of Europe at the time of classical antiquity had more in commonculturally speakingwith the Greco-Roman world, the intricacies involved in expansion across the European frontier were not so contentious relative to Indigenous issues.

Catholic Church and doctrine of discovery 

The doctrine of discovery is a legal and religious concept, tied to the Roman Catholic Church, which rationalized and "legalized" colonization and the conquering of Indigenous peoples in the eyes of Christianized Europeans. According to Indigenous rights' activists and legal scholars Robert J. Miller, Jacinta Ruru, Larissa Behrendt, and Tracey Lindberg, the roots of the doctrine go back as far as the fifth-century popes and leaders in the church who had ambitions of forming a global Christian commonwealth. The Crusades (1096–1271), fought to recover the Holy Lands from Muslim conquerors, built on this ambition of a justifiable holy war against those whom the church saw as infidels.

Pope Innocent IV's writings from 1240 were particularly influential upon Franciscus de Victoria and Hugo Grotius, secular legalists who lived in the sixteenth and seventeenth centuries and would later contribute significantly to the Doctrine of Discovery in their respective European Kingdoms. Innocent IV argued that Christians were justified in invading and acquiring infidels' lands because it was the church's duty to control the spiritual health of all humans on Earth. 

The doctrine developed further in the 15th century after the conflict between the Teutonic Knights and Poland over control of "pagan" Lithuania. At the Council of Constance (1414) the Knights argued that their claims were "authorized by papal proclamations dating from the time of the Crusades [which] allowed the outright confiscation of the property and sovereign rights of heathens". The Council disagreed, stating that non-Christians had claims to rights of sovereignty and property under natural law. However, the Council upheld that conquests could "legally" occur if non-Christians refused to comply with Christianization and natural law. This effectively meant that peoples who were not considered "civilized" by European standards or otherwise refused to assimilate under Christian authority were subject to war and forced assimilation: "Christians simply refused to recognize the right of non-Christians to remain free of Christian dominion."

Christian Europeans had already begun invading and colonizing lands outside of Europe before the Council of Constance, demonstrating how the doctrine was applied to non-Christian Indigenous peoples outside Europe. In the 14th and 15th centuries, the Indigenous peoples of the Canary Islands, known as Guanches, became the subject of some colonizers' attention. The Guanches had remained undisturbed and relatively "forgotten" by Europeans until Portugal began surveying the island for potential settlement in 1341. In 1344 the Papacy issued a bull which assigned the islands to Castile, a kingdom in Spain. In 1402, the Spanish began efforts to invade and colonize the islands. In 1436 Pope Eugenius IV issued a new papal edict, Romanus Pontifex, which authorized Portugal to convert Indigenous peoples to Christianity and to control the Canary Islands on behalf of the pope. The Guanches resisted European invasion until the surrender of the Guanche kings of Tenerife to Spain in 1496. The invaders brought destruction and diseases to the Guanche people, whose identity and culture disappeared as a result.

As Portugal expanded southward into North Africa in the 15th century, subsequent popes added new edicts which extended Portuguese authority over Indigenous peoples. In 1455, Pope Nicholas V re-issued the Romanus Pontifex with more direct language, authorizing Portugal "to invade, search out, capture, vanquish, and subdue all Saracens and pagans" as well as allowing non-Christians to be placed in slavery and have their property stolen. As stated by Robert J. Miller, Jacinta Ruru, Larissa Behrendt, and Tracey Lindberg, the doctrine developed over time "to justify the domination of non-Christian, non-European peoples and the confiscations of their lands and rights".

According to Miller, Ruru, Behrendt, and Lindberg, as Portugal had been granted "permissions" by the papacy to expand in Africa, Spain was moved to expand westward across the Atlantic Ocean, searching to convert and conquer Indigenous peoples in what became known as the "New World". The papal-endorsed division of the world between Spain and Portugal was formalized in the Treaty of Tordesillas in 1494. Miller, Ruru, Behrendt, and Lindberg state that the desire to explore and conquer outside of the papal jurisdiction assigned to Portugal led Spanish King Ferdinand and Queen Isabella to dispatch Christopher Columbus in 1492 with a mission to colonize and bring new lands under the Spanish crown. Columbus "discovered" a few islands in the Caribbean as early as 1493, and Ferdinand and Isabella immediately asked the pope to "ratify" the discovery. In 1493, Pope Alexander VI issued the Inter caetera divinai, which affirmed that since the islands had been "undiscovered by others" that they were now under Spanish authority. Alexander granted Spain any lands that it discovered as long as they had not been "previously possessed by any Christian owner". In the view of Miller, Ruru, Behrendt, and Lindberg, the beginnings of European colonialism in the "New World" effectively formalized the Doctrine of Discovery into international law, which in their view at that time meant law that was agreed upon by Spain, Portugal, and the Catholic Church. Indigenous peoples were not consulted or included in these arrangements.

This narrative is that of Robert J. Miller, Jacinta Ruru, Larissa Behrendt, and Tracey Lindberg; all of whom are Indigenous rights' activists and legal scholars, at times these authors cite to "commentators", not historians, primary sources or experts on the topic. According to historians, international law did not originate with the "Doctrine of Discovery", but has existed since antiquity, it is further the view that even what would be considered "modern international law" did not come into being until centuries later. Though significant developments and advancements in international law came about due to and during the age of discovery, the specific Church teachings invoked by Miller, Ruru, Behrendt and Lindberg were universally rejected, no nation ever gave any serious weight (including Catholic kingdoms such as England and France) to them, save Spain and Portugal. While it is correct that both Francisco de Vitoria and Hugo Grotius are widely considered instrumental in molding modern international law, both were "influenced" by the teachings of Pope Innocent IV only insofar as they promoted the inherent rights of all peoples regardless of their adherence to Christianity, both made infamous efforts of rejecting the specific views of Innocent IV cited by Miller, Ruru, Behrendt and Lindberg. Indeed, it is in actuality the established view of scholars and historians that Victoria, Grotius and Eugene IV were protectors, not adversaries of Indigenous peoples. Further, the uncontested view of historians has always been that Columbus reached the Caribbean in October 1492-not "as early as 1493"; having set sail with the intention of reaching Asia. It has long been agreed that Columbus never sought to "discover", nor accepted the fact he "discovered", new lands or peoples. 

Despite the view of Miller, Ruru, Behrendt and Lindberg, Africa was not reserved to the Portuguese by Papal edict. The Bulls that they reference either applied only to the Canary Islands or were in reference to conduct in centuries old conflicts with the Moors and Arabs (collectively called "Saracens") who invaded the Iberian Peninsula before being thrown back by Portuguese and Spanish armies who then pursued them into North Africa, a region the Saracens were not the Indigenous peoples of. Furthermore, these regions were not "discovered" in any sense of the word as there had been regular interactions between the inhabitants of the Iberian peninsula and North Western Africa for millennia. Scholars and historians dispute if the any Papal Bull actually extended such rights to Portugal with regards to jurisdiction over Africa, in practice, this was never recognized by the Spanish. 

Historians have always agreed that Columbus' voyage was intended to facilitate profitable trade with Asian markets and that in sponsoring Columbus' voyage, the Spanish monarchs were seeking potential profitable trade routes, not new lands to colonize.

European colonialism in the New World 

Spain issued the Spanish Requirement of 1513 (Requerimiento), a document intended to inform Indigenous peoples that "they must accept Spanish missionaries and sovereignty or they would be annihilated". The document was supposed to be read to Indigenous peoples so that they theoretically could accept or reject the proposal before any war against them could be waged: "the Requerimiento informed the Natives of their natural law obligations to hear the gospel and that their lands had been donated to Spain". Refusal by Indigenous peoples meant that, in the Spaniards' eyes, war could "justifiably" be waged against them. Many conquistadors apparently feared that, if given the option, Indigenous peoples would actually accept Christianity, which would legally not permit invasion of their lands and the theft of their belongings. Legal scholars Robert J. Miller, Jacinta Rura, Larissa Behrendt, and Tracey Lindberg record that this commonly resulted in Spanish invaders reading the document aloud "in the night to the trees" or reading it "to the land from their ships". The scholars remark: "so much for legal formalism and the free will and natural law rights of New World Indigenous peoples."

England and France, both still Catholic countries in 1493, worked to "re-interpret" the Doctrine of Discovery to serve their own colonial interests. In the 16th century, England established a new interpretation of the Doctrine: "the new theory, primarily developed by English legal scholars, argued that the Catholic King Henry VII of England would not violate the 1493 papal bulls, which divided the world for the Spanish and Portuguese". This interpretation was also supported by Elizabeth I's legal advisors in the 1580s and effectively set a precedent among European colonial nations that the first Christian nation to occupy land was the "legal" owner and that this had to be respected in international law. This rationale was used in the colonization of what became Britain's Thirteen Colonies in mainland east-coast North America. King James I stated in the First Virginia Charter (1606) and in the Charter to the Council of New England (1620) that colonists could be given property rights because the lands were "not now actually possessed by any Christian Prince or People". English monarchs decreed that colonists should spread Christianity "to those [who] as yet live in Darkness and miserable Ignorance of the true Knowledge and Worship of God, [and] to bring the Infidels and Savages, living in those parts, to human civility, and to a settled and quiet Government".

This approach to colonization of newly "discovered" lands resulted in an acceleration of exploration and land-claiming, particularly by France, England, and Holland. Land claims were made through symbolic "rituals of discovery" that were performed to illustrate the colonizing state's legal claim to the land. Markers of possession such as crosses, flags, and plates claiming possession and other symbols became important in this contest to claim Indigenous lands. In 1642, Dutch explorers were ordered to set up posts and a plate that asserted their intention to establish a colony on the land. In the 1740s, French explorers buried lead plates at various locations to reestablish their 17th-century land claims to Ohio country. The French plates were later discovered by Indigenous peoples of the Ohio River. Upon contact with English explorers, the English noted that the lead plates were monuments "of the renewal of [French] possession" of the land. In 1774, Captain James Cook attempted to invalidate Spain's land-claims to Tahiti by removing Spanish marks of possession and then proceeding to set up English marks of possession. When the Spanish learned of this action, they quickly sent an explorer to reestablish their claim to the land.

European colonialists developed the legal concept of terra nullius (literally: nobody's land) or vacuum domicilium (empty or vacant house) to validate their lands claims over Indigenous peoples' homelands. This concept formalized the idea that lands which were not being used in a manner that European legal systems approved of were open for European colonization. Historian Henry Reynolds captured this perspective in his statement that "Europeans regarded North America as a vacant land that could be claimed by right of discovery." These new legal concepts developed in order to diminish reliance on papal authority to authorize or justify colonization claims.

As the "rules" of colonization became established in legal doctrines agreed upon by between European colonial powers, methods of laying claims to Indigenous lands continued to expand rapidly. As encounters between European colonizers and Indigenous populations in the rest of the world accelerated, so did the introduction of infectious diseases, which sometimes caused local epidemics of extraordinary virulence. For example, smallpox, measles, malaria, yellow fever, and other diseases were unknown in pre-Columbian Americas and Oceania.

Settler independence and continuing colonialism 

Although the establishment of colonies throughout the world by various European powers aimed to expand those powers' wealth and influence, settler populations in some localities became anxious to assert their own autonomy. For example, settler independence movements in thirteen of the British American colonies were successful by 1783, following the American Revolutionary War. This resulted in the establishment of the  United States of America as an entity separate from the British Empire. The United States continued and expanded European colonial doctrine through adopting the Doctrine of Discovery as the law of the American federal government in 1823 with the US Supreme Court case Johnson v. M'Intosh. Statements at the Johnson court case illuminated the United States' support for the principles of the discovery doctrine:The United States ... [and] its civilized inhabitants now hold this country. They hold, and assert in themselves, the title by which it was acquired. They maintain, as all others have maintained, that discovery gave an exclusive right to extinguish the Indian title of occupancy, either by purchase or by conquest; and gave also a right to such a degree of sovereignty, as the circumstances of the people would allow them to exercise. ... [This loss of native property and sovereignty rights was justified, the Court said, by] the character and religion of its inhabitants ... the superior genius of Europe ... [and] ample compensation to the [Indians] by bestowing on them civilization and Christianity, in exchange for unlimited independence.

Population and distribution

Indigenous societies range from those who have been significantly exposed to the colonizing or expansionary activities of other societies (such as the Maya peoples of Mexico and Central America) through to those who as yet remain in comparative isolation from any external influence (such as the Sentinelese and Jarawa of the Andaman Islands).

Precise estimates for the total population of the world's Indigenous peoples are very difficult to compile, given the difficulties in identification and the variances and inadequacies of available census data. The United Nations estimates that there are over 370 million Indigenous people living in over 70 countries worldwide. This would equate to just fewer than 6% of the total world population. This includes at least 5,000 distinct peoples in over 72 countries.

Contemporary distinct Indigenous groups survive in populations ranging from only a few dozen to hundreds of thousands and more. Many Indigenous populations have undergone a dramatic decline and even extinction, and remain threatened in many parts of the world. Some have also been assimilated by other populations or have undergone many other changes. In other cases, Indigenous populations are undergoing a recovery or expansion in numbers.

Certain Indigenous societies survive even though they may no longer inhabit their "traditional" lands, owing to migration, relocation, forced resettlement or having been supplanted by other cultural groups.  In many other respects, the transformation of culture of Indigenous groups is ongoing, and includes permanent loss of language, loss of lands, encroachment on traditional territories, and disruption in traditional ways of life due to contamination and pollution of waters and lands.

Environmental and economic benefits of the Indigenous stewardship of land

A WRI report mentions that "tenure-secure" Indigenous lands generates billions and sometimes trillions of dollars' worth of benefits in the form of carbon sequestration, reduced pollution, clean water and more. It says that tenure-secure Indigenous lands have low deforestation rates, they help to reduce GHG emissions, control erosion and flooding by anchoring soil, and provide a suite of other local, regional and global ecosystem services.
However, many of these communities find themselves on the front lines of the deforestation crisis, and their lives and livelihoods threatened.

Indigenous peoples and the environment 
Misconceptions about the historical relationship between Indigenous populations and their landbase has informed some Westerners view of California's "wild Eden", which may influence policy decisions about the "wilderness". Some academics assumed that the only pre-Colonial human interactions with nature were as "hunter-gatherers". Others say that the relationship was one of "calculated tempered use of nature as active agents of environmental change and stewardship". They argue that a view of "wilderness" as uninhabited nature has resulted in removal of Indigenous inhabitants to preserve "the wild", and that depriving the land of traditional Indigenous practices such as controlled burns, harvesting, and seed scattering has yielded dense understory shrubbery or tickets of young trees which are inhospitable to life. Recent studies indicate that Indigenous peoples used land sustainably, without causing substantial losses of biodiversity, for thousands of years.

A goal is to ascertain an unbiased view of Indigenous practices of resource management. Historical literature, archaeological findings, ecological field studies, and Native Peoples' cultures show indications that Indigenous land management practices were largely successful in promoting habitat heterogeneity, increasing biodiversity, and maintaining certain vegetation types, sustaining human lives while conserving natural resources.

Recently, it has come to light that the deforestation rate of Indonesian rainforests has been far greater than estimated. Such a rate could not have been the product of globalization as understood before; rather, it seemed that ordinary local people dependent on these forests for their livelihoods are in fact "joining distant corporations in creating uninhabitable landscapes."

In eastern Penan, three categories of misrepresentation are noticeable: The Molong concept is purely a stewardship notion of resource management. Communities or individuals take ownership of specific trees, maintaining and harvesting from them sustainably over a long period of time. Some feel this practice has been romanticized in environmentalist writings. Landscape features and particularly their names in local languages provided geographical and historical information for Penan people; whereas in environmentalist accounts, it has turned into a spiritual practice where trees and rivers represent forest spirits that are sacred to the Penan people. A typical stereotype of some environmentalists' approach to ecological ethnography is to present Indigenous "knowledge" of nature as "valuable" to the outside world because of its hidden medicinal benefits. In reality, eastern Penan populations do not identify a medicinal stream of "knowledge". These misrepresentations in the "narrative" of Indigeneity and "value" of Indigenous knowledge might have been helpful for Penan's people in their struggle to protect their environment, but it might also have disastrous consequences. What happens if another case did not fit in this romantic narrative, or another Indigenous knowledge did not seem beneficial to the outside world. These people were being uprooted in the first place because their communities did not fit well with the state's system of values.

Indigenous peoples by region

Indigenous populations are distributed in regions throughout the globe. The numbers, condition and experience of Indigenous groups may vary widely within a given region. A comprehensive survey is further complicated by sometimes contentious membership and identification.

Africa

In the postcolonial period, the concept of specific Indigenous peoples within the African continent has gained wider acceptance, although not without controversy. The highly diverse and numerous ethnic groups that comprise most modern, independent African states contain within them various peoples whose situation, cultures and pastoralist or hunter-gatherer lifestyles are generally marginalized and set apart from the dominant political and economic structures of the nation. Since the late 20th century these peoples have increasingly sought recognition of their rights as distinct Indigenous peoples, in both national and international contexts.

Though the vast majority of African peoples are "indigenous" in the sense that they originate from that continent, in practice, identity as an Indigenous people per the modern definition is more restrictive, and certainly not every African ethnic group claims identification under these terms. Groups and communities who do claim this recognition are those who, by a variety of historical and environmental circumstances, have been placed outside of the dominant state systems, and whose traditional practices and land claims often come into conflict with the objectives and policies implemented by governments, companies and surrounding dominant societies.

Americas

Indigenous peoples of the Americas are broadly recognized as being those groups and their descendants who inhabited the region before the arrival of European colonizers and settlers (i.e., pre-Columbian). Indigenous peoples who maintain, or seek to maintain, traditional ways of life are found from the high Arctic north to the southern extremities of Tierra del Fuego.

The impacts of historical and ongoing European colonization of the Americas on Indigenous communities have been in general quite severe, with many authorities estimating ranges of significant population decline primarily due to disease, land theft and violence. Several peoples have become extinct, or very nearly so. But there are and have been many thriving and resilient Indigenous nations and communities.

North America 
North America is sometimes referred to by Indigenous peoples as Abya Yala or Turtle Island.

In Mexico, about 25 million people self-reported as Indigenous in 2015. Some estimates put the Indigenous population of Mexico as high as 40-65 million people, making it the country with the highest Indigenous population in North America. In the southern states of Oaxaca (65.73%) and Yucatán (65.40%), the majority of the population is Indigenous, as reported in 2015. Other states with high populations of Indigenous peoples include Campeche (44.54%), Quintana Roo, (44.44%), Hidalgo, (36.21%), Chiapas (36.15%), Puebla (35.28%), and Guerrero (33.92%).

Indigenous peoples in Canada comprise the First Nations, Inuit and Métis.  The descriptors "Indian" and "Eskimo" have fallen into disuse in Canada. More currently, the term "Aboriginal" is being replaced with "Indigenous". Several national organizations in Canada changed their names from "Aboriginal" to "Indigenous". Most notable was the change of Aboriginal Affairs and Northern Development Canada (AANDC) to Indigenous and Northern Affairs Canada (INAC) in 2015, which then split into Indigenous Services Canada and Crown-Indigenous Relations and Northern Development Canada in 2017. According to the 2016 Census, there are around 1,670,000 Indigenous people in Canada. There are currently over 600 recognized First Nations governments or bands spread across Canada, such as the Cree, Mohawk, Mikmaq, Blackfoot, Coast Salish, Innu, Dene and more, with distinctive Indigenous cultures, languages, art, and music. First Nations peoples signed 11 numbered treaties across much of what is now known as Canada between 1871 and 1921, except in parts of British Columbia.

The Inuit have achieved a degree of administrative autonomy with the creation in 1999 of the territories of Nunavik (in Northern Quebec), Nunatsiavut (in Northern Labrador) and Nunavut, which was until 1999 a part of the Northwest Territories. The autonomous territory of Greenland within the Kingdom of Denmark is also home to a recognised Indigenous and majority population of Inuit (about 85%) who settled the area in the 13th century, displacing the Indigenous European Greenlandic Norse.

In the United States, the combined populations of Native Americans, Inuit and other Indigenous designations totaled 2,786,652 (constituting about 1.5% of 2003 U.S. census figures). Some 563 scheduled tribes are recognized at the federal level, and a number of others recognized at the state level.

Central and South America 
In some countries (particularly in Latin America), Indigenous peoples form a sizable component of the overall national populationin Bolivia, they account for an estimated 56–70% of the total nation, and at least half of the population in Guatemala and the Andean and Amazonian nations of Peru. In English, Indigenous peoples are collectively referred to by different names that vary by region, age and ethnicity of speakers, with no one term being universally accepted. While still in use in-group, and in many names of organizations, "Indian" is less popular among younger people, who tend to prefer "Indigenous" or simply "Native, with most preferring to use the specific name of their tribe or Nation instead of generalities. In Spanish or Portuguese speaking countries, one finds the use of terms such as índios, pueblos indígenas, amerindios, povos nativos, povos indígenas, and, in Peru, Comunidades Nativas (Native Communities), particularly among Amazonian societies like the Urarina and Matsés. In Chile, there the most populous indigenous peoples are the Mapuches in the Center-South and the Aymaras in the North. Rapa Nui of Easter Island, who are a Polynesian people, are the only non-Amerindian indigenous people in Chile.

Indigenous peoples make up 0.4% of all Brazilian population, or about 700,000 people. Indigenous peoples are found in the entire territory of Brazil, although the majority of them live in Indian reservations in the North and Center-Western part of the country. On 18 January 2007, FUNAI reported that it had confirmed the presence of 67 different uncontacted peoples in Brazil, up from 40 in 2005. With this addition Brazil has now overtaken the island of New Guinea as the country having the largest number of uncontacted peoples.

Asia

The vast regions of Asia contain the majority of the world's present-day indigenous populations, about 70% according to IWGIA figures.

Western Asia
Armenians are the Indigenous people of the Armenian Highlands. There are currently more Armenians living outside their ancestral homeland because of the Armenian genocide of 1915.
Anatolian Greeks, including the Pontic Greeks and Cappadocian Greeks, are the Greek-speaking minorities that existed in Anatolia millennia before Turkic conquest. They are indigenous to Asiatic Turkey. Most were either killed in the Greek genocide or displaced during the following population exchange; however, some remain in Turkey. There has been a Greek presence in Anatolia since at least the 1000s BCE, and Greek traders visited western Anatolia beginning in 1900 BCE.
Assyrians are indigenous to Mesopotamia. They claim descent from the ancient Neo-Assyrian Empire, and lived in what was Assyria, their original homeland, and still speak dialects of Aramaic, the official language of the Assyrian Empire.
Georgians are indigenous to Georgia.
Kurds are one of the Indigenous peoples of Mesopotamia.
Yazidis are indigenous to Upper Mesopotamia.

There are competing claims that Palestinian Arabs and Jews are indigenous to historic Palestine/the Land of Israel. The argument entered the Israeli–Palestinian conflict in the 1990s, with Palestinians claiming Indigenous status as a pre-existing population displaced by Jewish settlement, and currently constituting a minority in the State of Israel. Israeli Jews have also claimed indigeneity, citing religious and historical connections to the land as their ancient homeland; some have disputed the authenticity of Palestinian claims. In 2007, the Negev Bedouin were officially recognised as Indigenous peoples of Israel by the United Nations. This has been criticised both by scholars associated with the Israeli state, who dispute the Bedouin's claim to indigeneity, and those who argue that recognising just one group of Palestinians as indigenous risks undermining others' claims and "fetishising" nomadic cultures.

South Asia

India's Andaman and Nicobar Islands in the Indian Ocean are also home to several Indigenous groups such as the Andamanese of Strait Island, the Jarawas of Middle Andaman and South Andaman Islands, the Onge of Little Andaman Island and the uncontacted Sentinelese of North Sentinel Island. They are registered and protected by the Indian government.

In Sri Lanka, the Indigenous Vedda people constitute a small minority of the population today.

North Asia

The Russians invaded Siberia and conquered the indigenous people in the 17th–18th centuries.

Nivkh people are an ethnic group indigenous to Sakhalin, having a few speakers of the Nivkh language, but their fisher culture has been endangered due to the development of oil field of Sakhalin from 1990s.

In Russia, definition of "Indigenous peoples" is contested largely referring to a number of population (less than 50,000 people), and neglecting self-identification, origin from indigenous populations who inhabited the country or region upon invasion, colonization or establishment of state frontiers, distinctive social, economic and cultural institutions. Thus, indigenous peoples of Russia such as Sakha, Komi, Karelian and others are not considered as such due to the size of the population (more than 50,000 people), and consequently they "are not the subjects of the specific legal protections." The Russian government recognizes only 40 ethnic groups as indigenous peoples, even though there are 30 other groups to be counted as such. The reason of nonrecognition is the size of the population and relatively late advent to their current regions, thus indigenous peoples in Russia should be numbered less than 50,000 people.

East Asia

Ainu people are an ethnic group indigenous to Hokkaidō, the Kuril Islands, and much of Sakhalin. As Japanese settlement expanded, the Ainu were pushed northward and fought against the Japanese in Shakushain's Revolt and Menashi-Kunashir Rebellion, until by the Meiji period they were confined by the government to a small area near Lake Akan in Hokkaidō, in a manner similar to the placing of Native Americans on reservations. In a ground-breaking 1997 decision involving the Ainu people of Japan, the Japanese courts recognized their claim in law, stating that "If one minority group lived in an area prior to being ruled over by a majority group and preserved its distinct ethnic culture even after being ruled over by the majority group, while another came to live in an area ruled over by a majority after consenting to the majority rule, it must be recognized that it is only natural that the distinct ethnic culture of the former group requires greater consideration."

The Dzungar Oirats are indigenous to the Dzungaria in Northern Xinjiang.

The Sarikoli Pamiris are indigenous to Tashkurgan in Xinjiang.

The Tibetans are indigenous to Tibet.

The Ryukyuan people are indigenous to the Ryukyu Islands.

The languages of Taiwanese aborigines have significance in historical linguistics, since in all likelihood Taiwan was the place of origin of the entire Austronesian language family, which spread across Oceania.

In Hong Kong, the indigenous inhabitants of the New Territories are defined in the Sino-British Joint Declaration as people descended through the male line from a person who was in 1898, before Convention for the Extension of Hong Kong Territory. There are several different groups that make up the indigenous inhabitants, the Punti, Hakka, Hoklo, and Tanka. All are nonetheless considered part of the Cantonese majority, although some like the Tanka have been shown to have genetic and anthropological roots in the Baiyue people, the pre-Han Chinese inhabitants of Southern China.

Southeast Asia

The Malay Singaporeans are the Indigenous people of Singapore, inhabiting it since the Austronesian migration. They had established the Kingdom of Singapura back in the 13th century. The name Singapore itself comes from the Malay word Singapura (Singa=Lion, Pura=City) which means the Lion City.

Dayak People are one of the Indigenous groups of Borneo. It is a loose term for over 200 riverine and hill-dwelling ethnic groups, located in Borneo, each with its own dialect, customs, laws, territory, and culture, although common distinguishing traits are readily identifiable.

The Cham are the Indigenous people of the former state of Champa which was conquered by Vietnam in the Cham–Vietnamese wars during Nam tiến. The Cham in Vietnam are only recognized as a minority, and not as an Indigenous people by the Vietnamese government despite being indigenous to the region.

The Degar (Montagnards) are indigenous to Central Highlands (Vietnam) and were conquered by the Vietnamese in the Nam tiến.

The Khmer Krom are the Indigenous people of the Mekong Delta and Saigon which were acquired by Vietnam from Cambodian King Chey Chettha II in exchange for a Vietnamese princess.

In Indonesia, there are 50 to 70 million people who classify as indigenous peoples. However, the Indonesian government does not recognize the existence of indigenous peoples, classifying every Native Indonesian ethnic group as "indigenous" despite the clear cultural distinctions of certain groups. This problem is shared by many other countries in the ASEAN region.

In the Philippines, there are 135 ethno-linguistic groups, majority of which are considered as Indigenous peoples by mainstream Indigenous ethnic groups in the country. The Indigenous people of Cordillera Administrative Region and Cagayan Valley in the Philippines are the Igorot people. The Indigenous peoples of Mindanao are the Lumad peoples and the Moro (Tausug, Maguindanao Maranao and others) who also live in the Sulu archipelago. There are also others sets of Indigenous peoples in Palawan, Mindoro, Visayas, and the rest central and south Luzon. The country has one of the largest Indigenous peoples population in the world.

In Myanmar, indigenous peoples include the Shan, the Karen, the Rakhine, the Karenni, the Chin, the Kachin and the Mon. However, there are more ethnic groups that are considered indigenous, for example, the Akha, the Lisu, the Lahu or the Mru, among others.

Europe

Various ethnic groups have lived in Europe for millennia. However, the UN recognizes very few Indigenous populations within Europe, which are confined to the far north and far east of the continent.

Notable Indigenous minority populations in Europe that are recognized by the UN include the Sámi peoples of northern Norway, Sweden, and Finland and northwestern Russia (in an area also referred to as Sápmi); the Uralic Nenets, Samoyed, and Komi peoples of northern Russia; the Circassians of southern Russia and the North Caucasus; the Crimean Tatars, Krymchaks, and Crimean Karaites of Crimea in Ukraine; the Basques of Basque Country, Spain and southern France; the Sorbs of Germany and Poland, the Irish Travellers of the island of Ireland, and the Sardinians of Sardinia.

Oceania

In Australia, the Indigenous populations are the Aboriginal Australian peoples (comprising many different nations and language groups) and the Torres Strait Islander peoples (also with sub-groups). These two groups are often referred to as Indigenous Australians, although terms such as First Nations and First Peoples are also used.

Polynesian, Melanesian and Micronesian peoples originally populated many of the present-day Pacific Island countries in the Oceania region over the course of thousands of years. European, American, Chilean and Japanese colonial expansion in the Pacific brought many of these areas under non-Indigenous administration, mainly during the 19th century. During the 20th century, several of these former colonies gained independence and nation-states formed under local control. However, various peoples have put forward claims for Indigenous recognition where their islands are still under external administration; examples include the Chamorros of Guam and the Northern Marianas, and the Marshallese of the Marshall Islands. Some islands remain under administration from Paris, Washington, London or Wellington.

The remains of at least 25 miniature humans, who lived between 1,000 and 3,000 years ago, were recently found on the islands of Palau in Micronesia.

In most parts of Oceania, Indigenous peoples outnumber the descendants of colonists. Exceptions include Australia, New Zealand and Hawaii. In New Zealand the Māori population estimate at 30 June 2021 is 17% of the population. Māori are indigenous to Polynesia and settled New Zealand after migrations probably in the 13th century. A treaty with the British, the Treaty of Waitangi, was signed in 1840 by approximately 45 Māori leaders, following in 1835 the signing of He Whakaputanga o te Rangatiratanga o Nu Tirene: the Declaration of Independence of the United Tribes of New Zealand as a statement of sovereignty by Māori to the wider world and an assertion of the Indigenous rights of Māori in New Zealand, this led to the Treaty of Waitangi.

A majority of the Papua New Guinea population is Indigenous, with more than 700 different nationalities recognized in a total population of 8 million. The country's constitution and key statutes identify traditional or custom-based practices and land tenure, and explicitly set out to promote the viability of these traditional societies within the modern state. However, conflicts and disputes concerning land use and resource rights continue between indigenous groups, the government, and corporate entities.

Indigenous rights and other issues

Indigenous peoples confront a diverse range of concerns associated with their status and interaction with other cultural groups, as well as changes in their inhabited environment. Some challenges are specific to particular groups; however, other challenges are commonly experienced.  These issues include cultural and linguistic preservation, land rights, ownership and exploitation of natural resources, political determination and autonomy, environmental degradation and incursion, poverty, health, and discrimination.

The interactions between Indigenous and non-Indigenous societies throughout history and contemporarily have been complex, ranging from outright conflict and subjugation to some degree of mutual benefit and cultural transfer. A particular aspect of anthropological study involves investigation into the ramifications of what is termed first contact, the study of what occurs when two cultures first encounter one another. The situation can be further confused when there is a complicated or contested history of migration and population of a given region, which can give rise to disputes about primacy and ownership of the land and resources.

Wherever Indigenous cultural identity is asserted, common societal issues and concerns arise. These concerns are often not unique to Indigenous groups. Despite the diversity of Indigenous peoples, they share common problems and issues in dealing with the prevailing, or invading, society. They are generally concerned that the cultures and lands of Indigenous peoples are being lost and that Indigenous peoples suffer both discrimination and pressure to assimilate into the surrounding or colonizing societies. This is borne out by the fact that the lands and cultures of nearly all of the peoples listed at the end of this article are under threat. Notable exceptions are the Sakha and Komi peoples (two northern Indigenous peoples of Russia), who now control their own autonomous republics within the Russian state, and the Canadian Inuit, who form a majority of the territory of Nunavut (created in 1999). Despite the control of their territories, many Sakha people have lost their lands as a result of the Russian Homestead Act, which allows any Russian citizen to own any land in the Far Eastern region of Russia. This rejection ended up recognizing that there was a pre-existing system of law practised by the Meriam people.

A 2009 United Nations publication says:Although indigenous peoples are often portrayed as a hindrance to development, their cultures and traditional knowledge are also increasingly seen as assets. It is argued that it is important for the human species as a whole to preserve as wide a range of cultural diversity as possible, and that the protection of indigenous cultures is vital to this enterprise.

Human rights violations

The Bangladeshi Government has stated that there are "no indigenous peoples in Bangladesh". This statement has angered the Indigenous peoples of Chittagong Hill Tracts, Bangladesh, collectively known as the Jumma. Experts have protested against this move of the Bangladesh Government and have questioned the Government's definition of the term "indigenous peoples". This move by the Bangladesh Government is seen by the Indigenous peoples of Bangladesh as another step by the Government to further erode their already limited rights.

Hindus and Chams have both experienced religious and ethnic persecution and restrictions on their faith under the current Vietnamese government, with the Vietnamese state confiscating Cham property and forbidding Cham from observing their religious beliefs. Hindu temples were turned into tourist sites against the wishes of the Cham Hindus. In 2010 and 2013 several incidents occurred in Thành Tín and Phươc Nhơn villages where Cham were murdered by Vietnamese. In 2012, Vietnamese police in Chau Giang village stormed into a Cham Mosque, stole the electric generator, and also raped Cham girls. Cham in the Mekong Delta have also been economically marginalised, with ethnic Vietnamese settling on land previously owned by Cham people with state support.

The Indonesian government has outright denied the existence of Indigenous peoples within the countries' borders. In 2012, Indonesia stated that 'The Government of Indonesia supports the promotion and protection of indigenous people worldwide ... Indonesia, however, does not recognize the application of the indigenous peoples concept ... in the country'. Along with the brutal treatment of the country's Papuan people (a conservative estimate places the violent deaths at 100,000 people in West New Guinea since Indonesian occupation in 1963, see Papua Conflict) has led to Survival International condemning Indonesia for treating its Indigenous peoples as the worst in the world.

The Vietnamese viewed and dealt with the Indigenous Montagnards from the Central Highlands of Vietnam as "savages", which caused a Montagnard uprising against the Vietnamese. The Vietnamese were originally centered around the Red River Delta but engaged in conquest and seized new lands such as Champa, the Mekong Delta (from Cambodia) and the Central Highlands during Nam Tien. While the Vietnamese received strong Chinese influence in their culture and civilization and were Sinicized, and the Cambodians and Laotians were Indianized, the Montagnards in the Central Highlands maintained their own Indigenous culture without adopting external culture and were the true Indigenous of the region. To hinder encroachment on the Central Highlands by Vietnamese nationalists, the term Pays Montagnard du Sud-Indochinois (PMSI) emerged for the Central Highlands along with the indigenous being addressed by the name Montagnard. The tremendous scale of Vietnamese Kinh colonists flooding into the Central Highlands has significantly altered the demographics of the region. The anti-ethnic minority discriminatory policies by the Vietnamese, environmental degradation, deprivation of lands from the Indigenous people, and settlement of Indigenous lands by an overwhelming number of Vietnamese settlers led to massive protests and demonstrations by the Central Highland's indigenous ethnic minorities against the Vietnamese in January–February 2001. This event gave a tremendous blow to the claim often published by the Vietnamese government that in Vietnam "There has been no ethnic confrontation, no religious war, no ethnic conflict. And no elimination of one culture by another."

In May 2016, the Fifteenth Session of the United Nations Permanent Forum on Indigenous Issues (UNPFII) affirmed that Indigenous peoples are distinctive groups protected in international or national legislation as having a set of specific rights based on their linguistic and historical ties to a particular territory, prior to later settlement, development, and or occupation of a region. The session affirms that, since Indigenous peoples are vulnerable to exploitation, marginalization, oppression, forced assimilation, and genocide by nation states formed from colonizing populations or by different, politically dominant ethnic groups, individuals and communities maintaining ways of life indigenous to their regions are entitled to special protection.

The Indigenous people from Tanzania's Maasai community were reportedly subjected to eviction from their ancestral land to make way for a luxury game reserve by Otterlo Business Corporation in June 2022. The game reserve was reportedly being set up for the royals of the United Arab Emirates also linked to OBC or the Otterlo Business Corporation. According to lawyers and human rights groups and activists, approximately 30 Maasai people were injured by security forces in the process of eviction and delimiting a land area of 1500 km2. A 2019 UN report has described OBC as a 'UAE-based' luxury-game hunting company, granted a license to hunt by the Tanzanian government in 1992 for "the UAE royal family to organize private hunting trips", denying the Maasai people access to their own land.

Health issues

In December 1993, the United Nations General Assembly proclaimed the International Decade of the World's Indigenous People, and requested UN specialized agencies to consider with governments and indigenous people how they can contribute to the success of the Decade of Indigenous People, commencing in December 1994. As a consequence, the World Health Organization, at its Forty-seventh World Health Assembly, established a core advisory group of Indigenous representatives with special knowledge of the health needs and resources of their communities, thus beginning a long-term commitment to the issue of the health of Indigenous peoples.

The World Health Organization noted in 2003 that "Statistical data on the health status of indigenous peoples is scarce. This is especially notable for indigenous peoples in Africa, Asia and eastern Europe", but snapshots from various countries (where such statistics are available) show that indigenous people are in worse health than the general population, in advanced and developing countries alike: higher incidence of diabetes in some regions of Australia; higher prevalence of poor sanitation and lack of safe water among Twa households in Rwanda; a greater prevalence of childbirths without prenatal care among ethnic minorities in Vietnam; suicide rates among Inuit youth in Canada are eleven times higher than the national average; infant mortality rates are higher for Indigenous peoples everywhere.

The first UN publication on the State of the World's Indigenous Peoples revealed alarming statistics about indigenous peoples' health. Health disparities between indigenous and non-indigenous populations are evident in both developed and developing countries. Native Americans in the United States are 600 times more likely to acquire tuberculosis and 62% more likely to commit suicide than the non-Indian population. Tuberculosis, obesity, and type 2 diabetes are major health concerns for the indigenous in developed countries. Globally, health disparities touch upon nearly every health issue, including HIV/AIDS, cancer, malaria, cardiovascular disease, malnutrition, parasitic infections, and respiratory diseases, affecting indigenous peoples at much higher rates. Many causes of Indigenous children's mortality could be prevented. Poorer health conditions amongst indigenous peoples result from longstanding societal issues, such as extreme poverty and racism, but also the intentional marginalization and dispossession of Indigenous peoples by dominant, non-Indigenous populations and societal structures.

Racism and discrimination

Indigenous peoples have frequently been subjected to various forms of racism and discrimination. Indigenous peoples have been denoted as being barbaric, primitive, savage or uncivilized. These terms were commonly used during the heyday of European colonial expansion, and they are still being used by certain societies in modern times.

During the 17th century, Europeans commonly labeled Indigenous peoples "uncivilized". Some philosophers, such as Thomas Hobbes (1588-1679), considered Indigenous people mere "savages". Others (especially literary figures in the 18th century) popularized the concept of "noble savages". Those who were close to the Hobbesian view tended to believe that they had a duty to "civilize" and "modernize" the Indigenous.

Survival International runs a campaign to stamp out media portrayals of Indigenous peoples as "primitives" or "savages".

After World War I (1914-1918), many Europeans came to doubt the morality of the means which were used to "civilize" peoples. At the same time, the anti-colonial movement, and advocates for the rights of Indigenous peoples, argued that words such as "civilized" and "savage" were products and tools of colonialism, and they also argued that colonialism itself was savagely destructive. In the mid-20th century, European attitudes began to shift to the view that Indigenous and tribal peoples are the only peoples who should have the right to decide what should happen to their ancient cultures and their ancestral lands.

Cultural appropriation 
New Age and Neopagan adherents often look to the cultures of Indigenous peoples seeking to find ancient traditional truths and spiritual practices to appropriate into their lifestyles and worldviews.

Environmental injustice 
 At an international level, Indigenous peoples have received increased recognition of their environmental rights since 2002, but few countries respect these rights in reality. The UN Declaration on the Rights of Indigenous Peoples, adopted by the General Assembly in 2007, established Indigenous peoples' right to self-determination, stating rights to manage natural resources, and cultural and intellectual property. In countries where these rights are recognized, land titling and demarcation procedures are often put on delay, or leased out by the state as concessions for extractive industries without consulting Indigenous communities.

Many in the United States federal government are in favor of exploiting oil reserves in the Arctic National Wildlife Refuge, where the Gwich'in Indigenous people rely on herds of caribou. Oil drilling could destroy thousands of years of culture for the Gwich'in. On the other hand, some of the Inupiat people, from another Indigenous community in the region, favor oil drilling because they could benefit economically.

The introduction of industrial agricultural technologies such as fertilizers, pesticides, and large plantation schemes have destroyed ecosystems that Indigenous communities formerly depended on, forcing resettlement. Development projects such as dam construction, pipelines and resource extraction have displaced large numbers of Indigenous peoples, often without providing compensation. Governments have forced Indigenous peoples off of their ancestral lands in the name of ecotourism and national park development. Indigenous women are especially affected by land dispossession because they must walk longer distances for water and fuel wood. These women also become economically dependent on men when they lose their livelihoods. Indigenous groups asserting their rights has most often resulted in torture, imprisonment, or death.

The building of dams can hurt Indigenous peoples by hurting the ecosystems that provide them water, food. For example, the Munduruku people in the Amazon rainforest are opposing the building of Tapajós dam with the help of Greenpeace.

Most Indigenous populations are already subject to the deleterious effects of climate change. Climate change has not only environmental, but also human rights and socioeconomic implications for Indigenous communities. The World Bank acknowledges climate change as an obstacle to Millennium Development Goals, notably the fight against poverty, disease, and child mortality, in addition to environmental sustainability.

Use of indigenous knowledge 

Indigenous knowledge is considered as very important for issues linked with sustainability. Professor Martin Nakata is a pioneer in the field of bringing indigenous knowledge to mainstream academics and media through digital documentation of unique contributions by aboriginal people.

The World Economic Forum supports using indigenous knowledge and giving to the indigenous peoples ownership of their land for protecting nature.

Knowledge reconstruction 
The Western and Eastern Penan people are two major groups of Indigenous populations in Malaysia. The Eastern Penan are famous for their resistance to loggers threatening their natural resources, specifically Sago palms and various fruit bearing trees. Because of the Penan's international fame, environmentalists often visited the area to document such happenings and learn more about and from the people there, including their perspective on the land's invasion.

Environmentalists such as Davis and Henley, who Brosius writes lumped all native groups of Malaysia into one homogeneous group with the same ideas and traditions, and lacked dialectical connections needed to deeply understand the Penan, lacked full knowledge of the situation's specific weight to the Indigenous peoples. The two embarked on a mission, stating they wished to help with conservation of the Penan's land resources, but Brosious states they were among the many who repackaged traditional knowledge into something that fit a Western narrative and agenda, and that Davis and Henley romanticized and misconstrued the traditional Penan concept of molong (meaning: "to preserve"the Penan marked trees for personal use and to preserve them for future harvesting of fruits or for materials).

Another common occurrence is to extend Indigenous knowledge beyond its limits and into unrelated meanings that western consumers find spiritually profound. This tendency of journalists extends beyond Davis and Henley. It serves non-Natives to add a narrative and value beyond that which already exists within the knowledge base of Indigenous peoples. Not only do these fictionalized accounts of some Indigenous knowledge and traditions skew the beliefs of onlookers, but they also contribute to cultural genocide as the actual spiritual and religious beliefs of the Indigenous people are disappeared and replaced with the westernized fiction.

See also

 Collective rights
 Colonialism
 Cultural appropriation
 Ethnic minority
 
 Genocide of Indigenous peoples
 Human rights
 The Image Expedition
 Indigenism
 Indigenous Futurisms
 Indigenous intellectual property
 Indigenous Peoples Climate Change Assessment Initiative
 Indigenous rights
 Intangible cultural heritage
 International Day of the World's Indigenous Peoples
 National Indigenous Peoples Day, Canada
 Indigenous Peoples' Day (United States)
 Isuma
 List of active non-governmental organizations of national minorities, Indigenous and diasporas
 List of ethnic groups
 List of Indigenous peoples
 Missing and murdered Indigenous women
 Uncontacted peoples
 United Nations Permanent Forum on Indigenous Issues
 Unrepresented Nations and Peoples Organization
 Virgin soil epidemic

Notes

References

Further reading

External links

 Awareness raising film by Rebecca Sommer for the Secretariat of the UNPFII 
 "First Peoples" from PBS
 "The Indigenous World" from International Work Group for Indigenous Affairs
"Oaxaca: A Land of Amazing Diversity" by John P. Shmal

Institutions
 IFAD and indigenous peoples (International Fund for Agricultural Development, IFAD)
 IPS Inter Press Service News on indigenous peoples from around the world